Dos Createres is a poorly researched volcano in Chile, with two edifices. It is dated 7.9±0.5 Ma mya.

References

Volcanoes of Chile